LHS 475 is a red dwarf star located  away from the Solar System in the constellation of Octans. It hosts one known exoplanet.

Planetary system 

The exoplanet LHS 475 b was initially found in transit data from TESS, and its confirmation using the NIRSpec instrument of the James Webb Space Telescope, which also observed its transmission spectrum, was published in January 2023. The data is consistent with a featureless spectrum, as would be expected of a planet with no atmosphere, but is also consistent with some types of atmosphere, such as a carbon dioxide-dominated atmosphere. Other atmospheric compositions, such as a methane-dominated atmosphere, are ruled out by this spectrum. The planet completes an orbit around its star in just two days and is likely tidally locked.

Notes

References 

Octans
M-type main-sequence stars
Planetary systems with one confirmed planet
4102
J19205439-8233170
0910
369327947